Highway 94 (AR 94, Ark. 94, and Hwy. 94) is an east–west state highway in Benton County, Arkansas. The route of  runs from Horseshoe Bend Park near Beaver Lake west across US Route 71 Business (US 71B) and US 62 to Missouri Supplemental Route E at the Missouri state line.  The route is maintained by the Arkansas State Highway and Transportation Department (AHTD).

Route description

The route begins at Horseshoe Bend Park on Beaver Lake and runs northwest. The route meets a spur route that runs to Monte Ne before meeting U.S. Route 71B (US 71B) in Rogers. The route runs north concurrently with US 71B until New Hope Road. US 71B turns left and Highway 94 continues north as 8th Street until a junction with US 62/Highway 12 in north Rogers. The overlap ends at a junction where Highway 12 turns right, Highway 94 turns left, and US 62 continues straight ahead to Eureka Springs.

Highway 94 runs north through Little Flock into Pea Ridge, where the route intersects Highway 72. North of the Highway 72 junction, Highway 94 meets Highway 265 before terminating at Missouri supplemental route E at the Missouri state line.

Major intersections

Monte Ne spur

Highway 94 Spur (AR 94S, Ark. 94S, and Hwy. 94S) is an east–west state highway spur route to Mont Ne. The route of  serves to connect the former tourist destination to the state highway system via Highway 94.

Major intersections

See also

Notes

References

External links

094
Transportation in Benton County, Arkansas
094